Jeewan Singh Titiyal  is an Indian ophthalmologist, credited with the first live cornea transplant surgery by an Indian doctor. He was honoured by the Government of India, in 2014, by bestowing on him the Padma Shri, the fourth highest civilian award, for his services to the field of medicine.

Biography

Jeewan Singh Titiyal was born at Tidang, a small village in Dharchula, Pithoragarh district, along the Indo-Nepalese border in Uttarakhand state in India and did his early schooling at a local school in Dharchula. Choosing a career in medicine, Titiyal graduated from All India Institute of Medical Sciences, New Delhi and did his higher studies in ophthalmology from Dr. Rajendra Prasad Centre for Ophthalmic Sciences at AIIMS. He completed his senior residency in cornea and refractive unit from the same institute. Dr. Titiyal, on completion of his senior residency, joined the faculty of Dr. RP Centre for Ophthalmic Sciences itself, January 1991, to kick start his career and has been working there ever since. Rising up the ranks, he is now a Professor there, head of unit in the cornea and refractive surgery division.

Titiyal's sibling, Dr. Govind Singh Titiyal, is also an ophthalmologist and Professor, working in Susheela Tiwari Medical College, Haldwani, Uttrakhand.

Achievements and legacy
J. S. Titiyal, as a specialist in Keratoplasty, Refractive surgery, Stem Cell transplantation, Contact lens, Low Vision Aid and Cataract including Phacoemulsification and Pediatric cataract, has several notable achievements during his career. He is reported to have performed the first live cornea transplantation surgery among Indian surgeons. He is credited with the first Intacs procedure for complex corneal problems. He has done successful surgeries on many eminent personalities such as Dalai Lama, Manmohan Singh, former Indian Prime Minister, Sheila Dikshit, former Chief Minister of Delhi, Dr. Murali Manohar Joshi and Prakash Singh Badal, Chief Minister of Punjab, among others.

Titiyal delivered the first Dr. B. D. Joshi Oration on Therapeutic Contact Lenses in June 1999, organized by Vidarbha Ophthalmic Society. He has organized three international conferences on ophthalmology, the most notable one being the Orbis International, at New Delhi, in 1999. He regularly takes part in national and international conferences to give lectures and live surgical demonstrations. He has conducted various free eye camps across the country such as:

 IOL camp at Rewari, Haryana
 Mega Eye Camp at Odisha in October 1998
 Eye Camp at Andaman and Nicobar, in 1992
 Mega Eye Camp at Shillong, in September 2003

In 2001, Titiyal conducted a training program, in Thiruvananthapuram, in September 2001, on invitation from the Government of Kerala. He sits on the examination boards of various universities for their medical examinations and serves as the official advisor to the Union Public Service Commission.

Positions
Dr. J. S. Titiyal has been associated with many organizations, working with them holding positions of responsibility.
 Officer in Charge - National Eye Bank, India
 President - Delhi Ophthalmological Society
 President - Indian Society of Corneal and Kerato-Refractive Surgeons (ISCKRS)
 Member- American Society of Cataract and Refractive Surgery
 Member- Contact Lens Association of Ophthalmologist (CLAO) USA
 Member- International Association of Contact Lens Educators (IACLE)
 Member- All India Ophthalmological Society

Awards and recognitions
Titiyal was honoured by the Government of India by awarding him the Padma Shri, in 2014, in recognition of his efforts to the cause of medicine.

Publications
Titiyal has written many articles which have been published in per-reviewed journals of international repute. He has also written chapters in many ophthalmological text books. He is the Chief Editor of DOS Times, the monthly bulletin of Delhi Ophthalmological Society.

Selected articles

References

External links
 
 
 

Living people
Recipients of the Padma Shri in medicine
Indian ophthalmologists
People from Pithoragarh district
Medical doctors from Uttarakhand
20th-century Indian medical doctors
Year of birth missing (living people)
20th-century surgeons